Dracaenura is a genus of moths of the family Crambidae. It was described by Edward Meyrick in 18863.

Species
Dracaenura adela Tams, 1935
Dracaenura aegialitis Meyrick, 1910
Dracaenura agramma Meyrick, 1886
Dracaenura albonigralis Hampson, 1897
Dracaenura arfakalis Swinhoe, 1918
Dracaenura asthenota Meyrick, 1886
Dracaenura chrysochroa Hampson, 1907
Dracaenura cincticorpus Hampson, 1897
Dracaenura horochroa Meyrick, 1886
Dracaenura leucoprocta Hampson, 1897
Dracaenura myota Meyrick, 1886
Dracaenura pelochra Meyrick, 1886
Dracaenura prosthenialis Hampson, 1897
Dracaenura pseudopelochra Rothschild, 1915
Dracaenura semialbalis Rothschild, 1915
Dracaenura stenosoma (C. Felder, R. Felder & Rogenhofer, 1875)
Dracaenura tagiadialis Hampson, 1897
Dracaenura torridalis Kenrick, 1907

References

External links

Spilomelinae
Crambidae genera
Taxa named by Edward Meyrick